North Temple Bridge/Guadalupe station, often referred to as simply North Temple, is a light rail and commuter rail station in Salt Lake City, Utah, United States. It is operated by the Utah Transit Authority, and serves the TRAX light rail system's Green Line as well as FrontRunner commuter rail. The Green Line provides service from the Salt Lake City International Airport to West Valley City (via Downtown Salt Lake City) and connects with the rest of the TRAX system and UTA's S Line streetcar.

Description 
North Temple Bridge/Guadalupe can be accessed from 300 North at 500 West (both from the east and west), but is also accessible from 200 North on the east and from 500 West on the south. There is no direct vehicle access to the TRAX platform (as there is no stopping allowed on the North Temple Street Viaduct), but pedestrians can use stairs or escalators that connect north side of the North Temple Street Viaduct with the south end of the FrontRunner platform. Pedestrians can also access the TRAX platform from either end of the North Temple Street Viaduct at 400 West or 600 West. Although both platforms are listed as "at grade", the station is still considered a flying junction since the TRAX tracks pass over the FrontRunner and Union Pacific tracks. Just east of the station is West High School and south of the station is The Gateway, including the former Union Pacific Depot. The station is located within the Quiet Zone, so trains do not routinely sound their horns when approaching public crossings within this corridor.

The TRAX portion of the station is part of the Airport extension.  The FrontRunner portion is an infill station created to connect the Green Line to the FrontRunner after the Green Line was routed away from Salt Lake Central as part of the Airport Extension. The TRAX portion of the station is part of a railway right of way that was created specifically for the Green Line. Like many other UTA stations, this station has art work included in its design. The art work for the North Temple Bridge/Guadalupe station is the stairway and elevator connecting the upper and lower parts for the station. The roof of the stairway and sides of the elevator shaft were designed to have the appearance of a crystal. It is called Crystal Light and was designed by Catherine Widgery of Cambridge, Massachusetts. Although not part of FrontRunner South, the FrontRunner portion of the station opened on the same date as that extension, December 10, 2012. The station is operated by Utah Transit Authority.

References 

2012 establishments in Utah
2013 establishments in Utah
Railway stations in Salt Lake County, Utah
Railway stations in the United States opened in 2012
TRAX (light rail) stations